Zhenming was a Chinese era name used by several emperors of China. It may refer to:

Zhenming (禎明, 587–589), era name used by Chen Shubao, emperor of the Chen dynasty
Zhenming (貞明, 915–921), era name used by Zhu Youzhen, emperor of Later Liang (also used by concurrent rulers of Wuyue and Min Kingdom)

See also
Rectification of names or Zhengming, a Confucian concept